Adams–Myers–Bryan Farmstead is a historic home and farm and national historic district located at Valley Falls, Rensselaer County, New York. The farmhouse was built about 1855, and consists of three blocks.  It consists of a two-story, Greek Revival style main block with a two-story side wing and 1 1/2-story rear ell.  Also on the property are the contributing main barn group (c. 1860, c. 1880-1930), pump house (c. 1920-1940), milk house (c. 1920-1940), horse barn (c. 1850), corn house (c. 1850), pig house (mid-19th century), carriage barn (c. 1860-1875), ice house (c. 1900), and outhouse (c. 1900).

It was listed on the National Register of Historic Places in 2013.

References

Historic districts on the National Register of Historic Places in New York (state)
Farms on the National Register of Historic Places in New York (state)
Greek Revival houses in New York (state)
1800 establishments in New York (state)
Houses completed in 1855
Buildings and structures in Rensselaer County, New York
National Register of Historic Places in Rensselaer County, New York